Richard Boudet (2 March 1958, Antananarivo – 26 August 1995, Saint-Affrique) was a French archeologist who worked at the French National Centre for Scientific Research. He specialized in the French region of Aquitaine.

Books

Rituels des celtes d'Aquitaine, 1997
Rituels celtes d'Aquitaine, 1996
Monnaies gauloises à la croix, 1997
L'Âge du fer récent dans la partie méridionale de l'estuaire girondin, 1997

References

1958 births
1995 deaths
French archaeologists
History of Aquitaine
20th-century archaeologists